ALPA or Alpa may refer to:

 Alpa, a formerly Swiss camera design company and manufacturer of 35 mm cameras
 Alpa, Tavas
 Air Line Pilots Association, International
 Arbitrated Loop Physical Address, used in part of some computer systems, e.g. device numbering on Fibre Channel loops
 Alpa, an alternate name of Alope (Ozolian Locris), an ancient city of Greece